Langton is a village and civil parish in the East Lindsey district of Lincolnshire, England.

The village church is a Grade II listed building dedicated to St Margaret, and is a small structure built of greenstone, limestone and red brick. The original church on the site was
medieval. It was restored in 1750 and subjected to Victorian restoration in 1890 by W Scorer. Foundations of a tower can be seen on the outside of the west wall.

Langton Windmill was built of red brick in 1861, and ceased working in 1936.

References

External links

Villages in Lincolnshire
Civil parishes in Lincolnshire
East Lindsey District